"K. I. N. G." is a single by Norwegian black metal band Satyricon, from their 2006 album Now, Diabolical. The single was released on 3 April 2006, limited to 1,000 copies and for the Norwegian market only. The song and accompanying video saw limited airplay in the US on MTV's Headbangers Ball.

Track listing 
 "K. I. N. G." – 3:36
 "Storm (of the Destroyer)" – 2:48

Personnel

Satyricon 
 Satyr (Sigurd Wongraven) – vocals, guitar, keyboards
 Frost (Kjetil-Vidar Haraldstad) – drums

Session 
 Lars K. Norberg – bass guitar

External links 
 
 Norwegian Charts

2006 singles
Satyricon (band) songs